Rockingham Motor Speedway is a former racing motorsport venue in Rockingham, Northamptonshire, England, United Kingdom, near the town of Corby. It hosted professional and club races, as well as testing, track days, driver training, exhibitions and conferences. It claimed to be Europe's fastest racing circuit, and was the first banked oval constructed in Britain since the closure of Brooklands in 1939. 

The venue entered administration in 2017 and hosted its final motor race in November 2018. In 2021, the facility was purchased by Constellation Automotive for £80million.

History
Construction of Rockingham started late in 1999, with the opening meeting planned for May 2001.

Rockingham Motor Speedway was constructed on a British Steel works brown field site as a banked oval with the intention of bringing the American oval racing across the Atlantic for the first time. The opportunity was taken to use the infield for further circuits.

After almost ten years of planning and 23 months of construction work, Rockingham opened for business on Monday 15 January 2001. It was formally opened by the Queen on 26 May 2001.

After the sale of the venue, Rockingham held a "super send-off" to mark its final day as a racing circuit on 24 November 2018. The circuit was sold to Rockingham Automotive Limited, who used the facility for vehicle storage and logistics. In mid-2021, Constellation Automotive who own brands such as Cinch, and We Buy Any Car purchased the site.

The circuit

Rockingham had 13 configurations of track, which could be used for anything from touring cars to motorcycles to rally cars. The circuit was overlooked by the 6280 seat Rockingham Building, a steel-framed, glass-fronted grandstand building containing suites, offices, bars and kitchens, and by four grandstands. Together, the building and grandstands offered a total seating capacity of 52,000. The inner pit and paddock complex was accessed from the Rockingham Building via two pedestrian tunnels and there was a further spectator viewing area on top of the pit garages.

The oval circuit
Rockingham's oval was unique in the UK and one of only two speedways in Europe (the other being Lausitzring). The oval circuit could also be converted to a road course layout for events by positioning temporary chicanes and curves both on the main area and apron of the circuit.

Over the weekend of 20–22 September 2001, the Champ cars came to England for the first time to contest the Rockingham 500, a round of the CART (Championship Auto Racing Teams) FedEx Championship Series. Since the event was just a week after the 11 September terrorist attacks and subsequent closing of US airspace, the event was in jeopardy. However, the logistics were worked out, with many of the teams stripping off their sponsors' logos ("livery") as a mark of respect for the victims of the attacks. The race distance was also shortened to 300 km. The fastest lap, and therefore outright lap record, was set by Patrick Carpentier in 25.551secs in the Player's Forsythe Racing Reynard-Cosworth. Carpentier became for first Canadian to ever hold the outright lap record at an English circuit.

The US-based series returned in September 2002. This was the last time Champ Cars raced at this facility. The race ran over the full distance of 500 km, Scotland's Dario Franchitti took the chequered flag in his Team KOOL Green Lola-Honda, beating Cristiano da Matta by just 0.986 of a second .

The International Super Sportscar Circuit (ISSC)
Rockingham's International Super Sportscar Circuit was used by the Dunlop MSA British Touring Car Championship, as well as for most other car race events. The circuit combined long straights, sweeping high-speed bends (including the infamous Turn 1 and Gracelands) with a lower speed, highly technical infield layout. Average lap speeds around the circuit ranged from 1m 24s in the BTCC to 1m 12s in British F3.

Wet handling facility
The site had a wet handling area with a kick plate which was used to simulate a variety of driving conditions including ice, rain and slippery wet leaves. These different road conditions were simulated at much slower speeds than in normal driving and in a fully controlled environment. The area was designed to give drivers a greater understanding of the latest ABS, traction control and crash mitigating technologies, and the way that they affect vehicle control.

Layout configurations

Lap Records

Rockingham was the first purpose-built banked oval in the UK since Brooklands in 1907. It has an all-seating capacity of 52,000 and has both an oval and a racing circuit. The fastest official race lap records at Rockingham Motor Speedway are listed as:

Major racing results

CART Championship

+  Race shortened due to lack of practice.

British Formula Three season

British Touring Car Championship

British Superbike Championship

+  Qualification cancelled due to dangerous track conditions, grid decided by championship positions.

Other events

The Rockingham Stages
On 12 December 2004, the first Stage Rally, the Rockingham Stages, was held at the venue. This was jointly promoted by Middlesex County Automobile Club and Thame Motorsport Club. The two day event rapidly grew to be one of the favourite events on the British stage rally calendar. For several years it was a round of the MSN (Motor Sports News) Circuit Rally Championship.  The 2018 Rockingham Stages was the last competitive motorsport event to be held at the Speedway.

Oval racing
From 2001 to the end of 2007, Rockingham organised and funded American-style Stockcar racing on the oval. Originally known as ASCAR, the series changed name to "Days of Thunder", and then to SCSA (Stock Car Speed Association), before re-branding to the MAC Tools V8 Trophy for its final season in 2007. All cars were UK variants of the American "ASA National-Tour" Howe Racing chassis, running with either Ford, Chevrolet or Pontiac bodies. A change of circuit ownership for 2006 saw the end of promotion and funding for the series, and low grids in 2007 led the organising club (BRSCC) to amalgamate it with a road course series, and eventually to the demise of both championships before the end of 2008.

Other activities
The circuit was operational 357 days a year and the majority of events that took place at the venue were not motorsport competitions. Events ranged from manufacturer product launches to dealer training, track days and testing, and corporate and experience days.

The City Auction Group holds an auction weekly at the circuit.

The Learning Grid Rockingham Festival in the first week of July promotes science and engineering to school pupils.

The venue had a sizeable showground area which has hosted the following shows:

 The French Car Show
 The Site Equipment Demonstration (SED) Show
 Greenfleet
 The LCV Show
 Stobart Fest
 Japfest 2

Media appearances

Television
Fifth Gear
Wheeler Dealers
Saturday Night Takeaway
The Grand Tour
Top Gear

Magazines and newspapers
The Telegraph and Fiat held a track day at Rockingham in 2012 and published a number of articles featuring the circuit. Autosport Caterham SP300R video review was made on the ISSC , and Car Magazine did a track test on the Nissan GT-R vs Porsche 911 Turbo in 2012 and a McLaren supercar group test in 2010 . Car Dealer magazine reviewed the BMW M5 at Rockingham and compared it with a Mercedes E63 AMG, a Lexus ISF, a Porsche Panamera and an Infiniti M35h . The circuit also features on the Pistonheads website with videos showing the Caterham SP300 R and the new Astra VXR. Chris Harris on Cars showcased the BAC Mono .

References

External links
 Rockingham.co.uk – Rockingham official site
 Pickup Truck Racing
 Rockingham satellite image Google Maps
 MSN Circuit Rally Championship 
 Middlesex County Auto Club 

Champ Car circuits
Defunct motorsport venues in England
Sports venues in Northamptonshire